Chehre Pe Chehra is a 1981 Indian Hindi-language science fiction film produced and directed by Raj Tilak. It stars Sanjeev Kumar, Vinod Mehra, Shatrughan Sinha, Rekha and Sulakshana Pandit. It is an adaptation of the 1886 novella Strange Case of Dr Jekyll and Mr Hyde by Robert Louis Stevenson.

Plot 
Wilson is a scientist who feels that every human has both angelic and devilish elements in themselves. He strongly believes that these two elements can be segregated and then a medicine can be invented to eliminate the undesirable element, while leaving only the desirable element intact. Wilson eventually invents a potion to put his theory into effect. He decides to test the invention on himself. But the result does not occur as he had theorised: although his devilish persona gets segregated from his angelic persona, it is much more powerful, and Wilson is unable to eliminate it.

Cast 
 Sanjeev Kumar as Dr. Wilson / Blackstone
 Vinod Mehra as David
 Shatrughan Sinha as Advocate Sinha
 Amol Palekar as Peter 
 Rekha as Daisy
 Sulakshana Pandit as Diana 
 Amjad Khan as Carlos 
 Iftekhar as Colonel (Diana's Father)
 Gajanan Jagirdar as Police Commissioner
 Shreeram Lagoo as Church Priest
 Shammi  as Daisy's Friend
 Rajni Sharma as Martha (Carlos’ Sister)

Production 
The film is based on Strange Case of Dr Jekyll and Mr Hyde, a novella written by the Scottish author Robert Louis Stevenson. Sanjeev Kumar played the characters based on Jekyll and Hyde. His makeup was done by Shashikant Mhatre.

Music 
Sahir Ludhianvi wrote the songs while N. Datta composed music of the film.

Reception 
The film failed at the box office.

References

External links 

1980s Hindi-language films
1981 films
Dr. Jekyll and Mr. Hyde films
Films based on horror novels
Films scored by Datta Naik
Indian science fiction films
Hindi-language science fiction films